The 1963 Minnesota Golden Gophers football team represented the University of Minnesota in the 1963 Big Ten Conference football season. In their tenth year under head coach Murray Warmath, the Golden Gophers compiled a 3–6 record and were outscored by their opponents by a combined total of 117 to 95. 
 
Tackle Carl Eller received the team's Most Valuable Player award and was a consensus first-team All-American. Eller was also named All-Big Ten first team. Center Frank Marchiewski was named All-Big Ten second team. Offensive lineman Milt Sunde was named Academic All-Big Ten.

Total attendance at five home games was 286,797, an average of 57,759 per game. The largest crowd was against Michigan.

Schedule

Roster
 Carl Eller, Sr.

References

Minnesota
Minnesota Golden Gophers football seasons
Minnesota Golden Gophers football